Jeremiah M. P. Williams (died June 24, 1884) was a Baptist preacher and state legislator in Mississippi. He served several terms in the Mississippi Senate during and after the Reconstruction era. He represented Adams County, Mississippi.

He was one of the incorporators of the Mississippi Printing and Publishing Company. In 1870 he was Corresponding Secretary of the Colored Missionary Baptist Convention. He was designated to give the introductory sermon at its 1876 meeting.

He died in Minorville, Mississippi.

See also
African-American officeholders during and following the Reconstruction era

References

Year of birth missing
1884 deaths
People from Adams County, Mississippi
Mississippi state senators
African-American state legislators in Mississippi
Baptists from Mississippi
African-American politicians during the Reconstruction Era